"Luna Llena" is the debut single by Cuban-Spanish singer Malu Trevejo. The song was originally scheduled for release on September 8, 2017, though it was delayed and finally released on September 22, 2017, by In-Tu Linea and Universal Music Latin. On November 17, an English version of the song was released with Trevejo singing the whole song in English except for the chorus, which is still sung in Spanglish.

Music video 
The music video for Luna Llena was viewed over 33 million times in the first seven weeks after its release on Vevo and YouTube. The video features appearances by Calum Heaslip.

Charts

Certifications

References

2017 songs
2017 debut singles
Universal Music Latin Entertainment singles
Malu Trevejo songs
Spanish-language songs
Universal Music Latino singles
Songs written by Viktoria Hansen
Song recordings produced by the Fliptones